Arad McCutchan Stadium, located in Evansville, Indiana, United States, is the home of the University of Evansville soccer teams. It was originally built for the football team, but the university discontinued football in 1997.

It is named after Arad McCutchan, who was the basketball coach at the university for 31 years.

References

College soccer venues in the United States
Soccer venues in Indiana
Sports venues in Evansville, Indiana
Defunct college football venues
American football venues in Indiana